"We Love" is the first single from Sneaky Sound System's third studio album From Here To Anywhere. The Single debuted at 41 on the Australian Singles Chart and peaked at number 29.

Music video
The music video for We Love was directed by Ollie Evans. It features suggestive and deliberately misleading sexual silhouettes while a series of phallic and/or double-entendre items are also shown

Track listing

Chart performance

Release history

References

External links 
 Official Site
 'We Love' Music Video on YouTube

2011 singles
Sneaky Sound System songs
2011 songs
Songs written by Connie Mitchell
Modular Recordings singles